The Primary (formerly the Primary Association) is a children's organization and an official organization within the Church of Jesus Christ of Latter-day Saints (LDS Church). It acts as a Sunday school organization for the church's children (ages 3–11).

Purpose, objectives, and theme
The official purpose of Primary is to help parents in teaching their children to learn and live the gospel of Jesus Christ. The official objectives of Primary are to:

Teach children that they are children of God and that Heavenly Father and Jesus Christ love them;
help children learn to love Heavenly Father and Jesus Christ;
help children prepare to be baptized, to receive the Holy Ghost, and to keep their baptismal covenants;
help children grow in their understanding of the gospel plan and provide opportunities for them to live gospel principles;
help boys prepare to receive the priesthood and be worthy to use this power to bless and serve others; and
help girls prepare to be righteous young women, understand the blessings of the  priesthood and the temple, and serve others.

The Primary theme is "All thy children shall be taught of the Lord; and great shall be the peace of thy children".

History
Primary was first organized in 1878 by Aurelia Spencer Rogers in Farmington, Utah, and adopted church-wide in 1880 under the direction of Louie B. Felt, who served as the president of the organization through 1925. Rogers was concerned because younger Latter-day Saint children had too much unsupervised time due to the long hours that fathers and older sons kept on the farms and mothers and older daughters in the home. In particular, Rogers felt that the younger boys in the community were becoming unruly and mischievous. With permission from church leaders and under the initial direction of General Relief Society President Eliza R. Snow, Rogers organized a Primary Association for her local Farmington congregation on August 11, 1878. Two weeks later, the first meeting was held on August 28, with 215 children in attendance. That day, boys were specifically taught not to steal fruit from orchards and girls were taught not to hang on wagons. In addition, they were given lessons on faith, manners, obedience, and other principles.

May Anderson, the second general president of the Primary Association from 1925 to 1939, initiated what became Primary Children's Hospital in Salt Lake City (now part of Intermountain Healthcare). Anderson also helped establish kindergartens in Utah. In the 1970s, as a result of the Priesthood Correlation Program, the Primary Association was renamed "Primary".

Since April 2021, Camille N. Johnson has been the Primary General President, with Susan H. Porter as First Counselor and Amy Wright as Second Counselor. 

In the church's April 2022 general conference, it was announced that Johnson would become the new Relief Society General President on August 1, 2022. As a result, on that date, Porter will become the new Primary General President, with Wright serving as First Counselor and Tracy Y. Browning as Second Counselor.

Chronology of the general presidency of the Primary 

|}

Class names
The names of the classes in Primary have varied over time. The following is a partial list of names that have been applied to different age groups in Primary. In January 2010, the names of the classes were changed to the age of children entering the class, i.e., 4-year-olds are in the class CTR 4. Previously, names were indicative of the age children would turn the coming year, (4-year-olds in CTR 5)

Primary in the church today
Presently, the worldwide Primary provides Sunday school and church-related activities to approximately 1.1 million Latter-day Saint children. In most congregations, optional nursery care and supervision is available for children from 18 months to age 3. Classroom instruction begins for three-year-olds and continues to age 12, with classes grouped by age. At age 12, children begin to attend Sunday School and the Young Men or Young Women programs. The Primary has its own songbook, made up of original songs and hymns modified for children.

Where participants, classrooms or teachers are limited, multiple age-grouped classes may be taught together. In most congregations Primary classes are co-ed.

See also

Children's Songbook
CTR ring
I Am a Child of God
Priesthood Correlation Program
Relief Society
The Friend (LDS magazine)

Notes

External links 
 Primary: Official site

 
Religious organizations established in 1878
Children's religious organizations
Youth organizations based in Utah
1878 establishments in Utah Territory
Sunday schools
Organizations (LDS Church)